Ei Chheleta Bhelbheleta is a Bengali television Drama Series that premiered on 28 March 2016 to 23 July 2017 and aired on Zee Bangla. The show was produced by Magic Moments Motion Pictures, it starred Prapti Chatterjee and Somraj Maity in lead roles, Nabanita Malakar, Sabitri Chatterjee, Anusuya Majumdar, Shankar Chakraborty and Bharat Kaul in supporting roles. The show got replaced by a Fiction show Karunamoyee Rani Rashmoni.

Plot 
The show's unique name has been taken from common Bengali childhood rhyme. It truly captures the free-spirited love and chemistry between the protagonists - Abir and Shaluk. Life takes a turn when introvert city-bred boy 'Abir' meets the vivacious village girl 'Shaluk'. Their unusual friendship clicks in an instant and soon a sweet innocent chemistry develops between the two. Soon they realize their feelings towards each other. Thus, starts the story of their 'first love'. 'Eii Chhele Ta Bhelbhele Ta' is a tale of love, which follows the protagonists through myriad of situations and sees them unite against all odds. The story showcases a pure love story between two teenagers and how their love matures over time and rises above the different obstacles of life.
 
Two years leap
Two years later, Aishwarya is jailed and then after some days Shaluk becomes pregnant. There is happiness back In Shaluk's family. Later, Aishwarya makes a comeback as a new avatar of Shoroshoti to ruin Shaluk's happiness. She then tries to kill Shaluk. Later Shaluk is hospitalized and gives birth to a baby boy and Aishwarya's true colors are revealed in front of everyone.

Cast

Main 
 Prapti Chatterjee as  Shaluk- Abir's wife 
 Somraj Maity as Abir- Shaluk's husband

Recurring 
 Nabanita Malakar as Aishwarya aka Mimi 
 Sabitri Chatterjee as Shaluk's maternal grandmother
 Anusuya Majumdar as Jaan - Abir's paternal grandmother
 Rita Dutta Chakraborty as Shaluk's maternal aunt
 Shaktipada Dey as Shaluk's maternal uncle
 Shankar Chakraborty as Tirtha-Abir's father
 Rajasree Bhowmik as Kamalini, Abir's mother
 Bharat Kaul as Abinash Sen - Shaluk and Aishwariya's father, a doctor
 Ritoja Majumder as Aishwariya's mother
 Suchismita Chowdhury as Nilanjana, Akash and Pupe's mother, Shaluk's mother in law.
 Surajit Banerjee as Dipu-Akash and Pupe's father, Abir's younger paternal uncle
 Diganta Bagchi as Bublu- Abir's youngest paternal uncle, a doctor
 Samata Das as Bublu's wife
 Ayesha Bhattacharya as Pupe aka Pupe Didi, Ranga and Ful's sister
 Debolina Mukherjee as Dighi aka Ful Di
 Debjani Chakraborty as Nodi  aka Ranga Di
 Anindya Chatterjee as Shourya- Dighi's ex-husband
 Anindita Saha Kapileshwari as Shourya's fake mother
 Rahul Chakraborty as Shourya's fake father
 Rajanya Mitra as Sonali
 Suman Banerjee as Partha - Nodi's husband
 Chhanda K Chatterjee as Partha's mother
 Prantik Banerjee as Soumya - Dighi's second husband

References

 
2016 Indian television series debuts
Bengali-language television programming in India
2017 Indian television series endings
Zee Bangla original programming